Mirko Valentić (born 19 September 1932) is a Croatian historian.

Biography 
Mirko Valentić was born on 19 September 1932 in Ivanjska near Banja Luka, then part of the Vrbas Banovina, Kingdom of Yugoslavia (modern-day Bosnia and Herzegovina). In 1961 he graduated from the Faculty of Humanities and Social Sciences, University of Zagreb with a degree in History and received his doctorate in 1978 with the thesis "Hrvatsko-slavonska Vojna krajina i pitanje njezina sjedinjenja s Hrvatskom 1849.-1881" (Croatian-Slavonian Military Border and the question of its unification with Croatia 1849-1881). Since 1993 he has worked as a professor at the Croatian Studies of the University of Zagreb Department of History, Course Croatia from the 16th to the 18th century.

Since 2005 he has been a member of the council for the preparation of Amicus curiae before the International Criminal Tribunal for the Former Yugoslavia.

His research topics include the Military Frontier; Transport integration and Adriatic orientation of Croatia; Migration and colonization processes during the 16th and 17th centuries; Burgenland Croats; and "Greater Serbian projects" of the 19th and 20th centuries.

Selected works 
 Kameni spomenici Hrvatske XIII-XIX stoljeća, Zagreb, 1969.
 Gradišćanski Hrvati od XVI stoljeća do danas, Zagreb, 1970.
 Die Burgelaendische Kroaten, Eisenstadt: Landesmuseum Eisenstadt, 1972.
 The Military Frontier and the Question of Its Unification with Croatia, 1849–1881, Zagreb, 1981.
 Vojna krajina u Hrvatskoj, Zagreb, 1981.
 O etničkom korijenu hrvatskih i bosanskih Srba, Zagreb, 1992.
 Das Eisenbahnnetz in der Militaergrenze Plaene und Verwirklichung, Wien, 1993.
 Hrvatska na tajnim zemljovidima 18. i 19. st. Sv. 10: Varaždinska županija Zagreb, 2006
 Rat protiv Hrvatske - 1991. - 1995. - Velikosrpski projekti od ideje do realizacije, Zagreb, 2010.
 War against Croatia 1991 - 1995: Greater Serbian projects from idea to implementation, Zagreb - Slavonski Brod, 2012.

Awards
Časni znak zemlje Gradišće (2013)

References

External links 
List of scientific works for Mirko Valentić
Mirko Valentić, biography

1932 births
Croats of Bosnia and Herzegovina
20th-century Croatian historians
Yugoslav historians
21st-century Croatian historians
Scientists from Zagreb
Living people